Richmond upon Thames School (RTS), is a co-educational secondary free school located in Twickenham in the London Borough of Richmond, south-west London, established in September 2017. It is part of the Richmond Education and Enterprise Campus (REEC) that is being created at the site of Richmond upon Thames College (RUTC).

RTS is governed by the Richmond upon Thames School Trust, a partnership between Achieving for Children, Harlequins Rugby Club, Haymarket Media Group, Richmond Council and Richmond upon Thames College.

Like all English schools, RTS' population and performance data are published in the Department for Education's national tables.

References

Secondary schools in the London Borough of Richmond upon Thames
Twickenham
Free schools in London
Free Schools with a Local Authority Sponsor